A cascade refrigeration cycle is a multi-stage thermodynamic cycle. An example two-stage process is shown at right. (Bottom on mobile) The cascade cycle is often employed for devices such as ULT freezers.

In a cascade refrigeration system, two or more vapor-compression cycles with different refrigerants are used. The evaporation-condensation temperatures of each cycle are sequentially lower with some overlap to cover the total temperature drop desired, with refrigerants selected to work efficiently in the temperature range they cover. The low temperature system removes heat from the space to be cooled using an evaporator, and transfers it to a heat exchanger that is cooled by the evaporation of the refrigerant of the high temperature system. Alternatively, a liquid to liquid or similar heat exchanger may be used instead. The high temperature system transfers heat to a conventional condenser that carries the entire heat output of the system and may be passively, fan, or water-cooled.

Cascade cycles may be separated by either being sealed in separated loops, or in what is referred to as an "auto-cascade" where the gases are compressed as a mixture but separated as one refrigerant condenses into a liquid while the other continues as a gas through the rest of the cycle. Although an auto-cascade introduces several constraints on the design and operating conditions of the system that may reduce the efficiency it is often used in small systems due to only requiring a single compressor, or in cryogenic systems as it reduces the need for high efficiency heat exchangers to prevent the compressors leaking heat into the cryogenic cycles. Both types can be used in the same system, generally with the separate cycles being the first stage(s) and the auto-cascade being the last stage.

Peltier coolers may also be cascaded into a multi-stage system to achieve lower temperatures. Here the hot side of the first peltier cooler is cooled by the cold side of the second peltier cooler, which is larger in size, whose hot side is in turn cooled by the cold side of an even larger peltier cooler, and so on. Efficiency drops very rapidly as more stages are added but for very small heat loads down to near-cryogenic temperatures this can often be an effective solution due to being compact and low cost, such as in mid-range thermographic cameras.

References

Cooling technology
 
Preservation methods
Thermodynamic cycles
Thermodynamic processes
Thermodynamic systems
Cycle